Kenes is a masculine given name. Notable people with the name include:

 Kenes Aukhadiev (1938–2022), Soviet-Kazakh politician
 Kenes Rakishev (born 1979), Kazakh businessman

Kazakh masculine given names